Caridina multidentata is a species of shrimp in  the family Atyidae. It is native to Japan and Taiwan. Its common names include Yamato shrimp, Japanese shrimp, Amano shrimp, and algae shrimp.

Description
This species has a translucent body covered with a broken line of reddish brown points on its sides. The dorsal surface has a white stripe that runs from the head to the tail and the eyes are black. Females are easily distinguished from males by their more elongated lower row of dots.

Caridina multidentata fare best in temperatures of 18 °C to 28 °C. They are more active at higher temperatures, but may also have a shorter lifespan. They prefer a pH of 6.5 to 7.5. As with all crustaceans, they are extremely averse to copper due to their haemocyanin blood.

Caridina multidentata mate in freshwater streams and marshes. Female shrimp signal readiness to mate much like other shrimp species, by releasing pheromones into the water for the males to follow. The fertilized eggs are released and go through larval stages in brackish and salt water as they drift out to sea. The larvae return from the sea once they reach their final growth stage, and they remain in freshwater for the remainder of their lives.

In Captivity

According to different sources, Caridina multidentata was introduced into the world of aquaria by Takashi Amano in the early 1980s. They are usually used in an aquarium because they feed primarily on algae, thus cleaning the aquarium of it when present in sufficient numbers.  Caridina multidentata was previously known to aquarists as Caridina japonica but was renamed Caridina multidentata following a study in 2006.  

Many aquarists believe that Amano shrimp can sustain themselves on algae in the aquarium alone, however, this is not the case.  Amano shrimp thrive best on a diet of aquarium algae supplemented by algae wafers or spirulina flakes and occasional animal-based protein in the form of pellets, flakes, or frozen or live daphnia, mysis, etc..  It is also necessary to ensure there is calcium present in the water, calcium is vital to crustaceans in order for them to maintain their exoskeleton.

Amano shrimp are notoriously difficult to breed in captivity, as their eggs require a higher water salinity than the adults to survive. This means that virtually all amano shrimp in the pet trade are wild caught, since captive breeding is not considered economical.

References

External links

Amano shrimp (Caridina multidentata), Aquarium Wiki

Atyidae
Freshwater crustaceans of Asia
Crustaceans described in 1860
Crustaceans of Japan
Arthropods of Korea
Arthropods of Taiwan
Algae eaters
Taxa named by William Stimpson